Red Lion Borough Historic District is a national historic district located at Red Lion Borough in York County, Pennsylvania. The district includes 1,482 contributing buildings, 1 contributing site, and 2 contributing structures in the central business district and surround residential areas of Red Lion. Most of the buildings are residential and primarily date between 1880 and 1935, and include notable examples of the Colonial Revival and Italianate styles.  Notable non-residential buildings include the Red Lion Table Company building (1913), Red Lion Cabinet Company building (1917), C.H. Foreman cigar factory (1912), W.M. Gemmell & Company factory (1908-1912), Consolidated Tobacco Company (1915), E.A. Strobeck & Company factory, Roser Building (1876-1890), Odd Fellows Hall (c. 1885), Sheeler's General Store (1906), Bethany United Brethren Church (1928), Junior-Senior High School (1926), Hill School (1910-1912), U.S. Post Office (1934), and Maryland and Pennsylvania Railroad Station (1923).  Located in the district and separately listed is the Consumers Cigar Box Company.

It was listed on the National Register of Historic Places in 2000.

References 

Historic districts on the National Register of Historic Places in Pennsylvania
Italianate architecture in Pennsylvania
Colonial Revival architecture in Pennsylvania
Historic districts in York County, Pennsylvania
National Register of Historic Places in York County, Pennsylvania